Barrow Raiders are an English rugby league club who have had numerous notable players throughout their history.

Players earning international caps while at Barrow

 Robert "Bob" Ayres won caps for England while at Barrow 1938 Wales, France, 1945 Wales
 William "Bill" Burgess won caps for England while at Barrow 1923 Wales, 1924 Other Nationalities, 1925 Wales (2 matches), 1926 Wales, Other Nationalities, 1928 Wales, 1930 Other Nationalities won caps for Great Britain while at Barrow 1924 Australia (3 matches), New Zealand (3 matches), 1926-27 New Zealand (3 matches), 1928 Australia (3 matches), New Zealand (2 matches), 1929-30 Australia (2 matches)
 William "Bill" Burgess won caps for England while at Barrow 1962 France, 1969 Wales, France won caps for Great Britain while at Barrow 1962 France, 1963 Australia, 1965 New Zealand (2 matches), 1966 France, Australia (3 matches), New Zealand (2 matches), 1967 France, Australia, 1968 France, while at Salford 1969 France
 David Cairns won caps for England while at Barrow 1984 Wales won caps for Great Britain while at Barrow 1984 France (2 matches)
 Chris Camilleri won caps for Wales while at Barrow in 1980 against France, while at Widnes in 1982 against Australia, and while at Cardiff City (Bridgend) Blue Dragons in 1984 against England, and won caps for Great Britain while at Barrow in 1980 against New Zealand (2 matches)
 Charles "Charlie" W. Carr won caps for England while at Barrow 1924 Other Nationalities, 1925 Wales (2 matches), 1926 Wales, Other Nationalities, 1927 Wales, 1928 Wales won caps for Great Britain while at Barrow 1924 Australia (2 matches), New Zealand (2 matches), 1926-27 New Zealand (3 matches)
 Frank Castle won caps for England while at Barrow 1951 France, 1952 Other Nationalities (2 matches), Wales, 1953 Other Nationalities won caps for Great Britain while at Barrow 1952 Australia (3 matches), 1954 Australia
 David "Dave" Clarke won caps for Wales while at Barrow Raiders 2004(…2005?) 2-caps
 Val Cumberbatch won caps for England while at Barrow 1938 France

 John Cunningham won caps for England while at Barrow 1975 France, Wales
 Roy Francis won a cap for Great Britain while at Barrow in 1947 against New Zealand
 Harry Gifford won caps for England while at Barrow 1908 Wales, 1909 Australia (3 matches) won caps for Great Britain while at Barrow 1908-9 Australia (2 matches)
 Dennis Goodwin won caps for England while at Barrow 1955 Other Nationalities won caps for Great Britain while at Barrow 1957 France (2 matches), 1958 France, New Zealand (2 matches)
 John "Jack" Grundy won caps for Great Britain while at Barrow 1955 New Zealand (3 matches), 1956 Australia (3 matches), 1957 France (4 matches), Australia, New Zealand (World Cup 1957 3-caps, 1-try)
 George Gummer won caps for Wales while at Barrow 1936 2-caps
 Philip "Phil" Hogan won caps for England while at Hull K.R. 1979 France won caps for Great Britain while at Barrow 1977 France, New Zealand, Australia (2 matches), 1978 Australia (sub), while at Hull K.R. 1979 Australia, Australia (sub), New Zealand, New Zealand (sub)
 William "Willie" Horne won caps for England while at Barrow 1945 Wales (2 matches), 1946 France (2 matches), Wales (2 matches), 1947 France, Wales, 1949 Other Nationalities, 1952 Other Nationalities, Wales, 1953 France, Wales, Other Nationalities won caps for Great Britain while at Barrow 1946 Australia (3 matches), 1947 New Zealand, 1948 Australia, 1952 Australia (3 matches)
 Frederick "Fred" Hughes won caps for Wales while at Barrow, and Workington Town 1945…1946 3-caps
 George Hughes, won a cap for England (RU) while at Barrow in 1896 against Scotland

 Phil Jackson won caps for England while at Barrow 1955 Other Nationalities won caps for Great Britain while at Barrow 1954 Australia (3 matches), New Zealand (3 matches), 1954 France (2 matches), Australia, New Zealand, 1955 New Zealand (3 matches), 1956 Australia (3 matches), 1957 France, New Zealand, France (5 matches), 1958 France, Australia (2 matches), New Zealand (World Cup 1954 4-caps 3-tries, 1957 2-caps, 2-tries)
 Keith Jarrett won caps for Wales (RU) while at Newport RFC (RU) 10-caps, won caps for British Lions (RU) while at Newport RFC (RU) ?-caps, won caps for Wales while at Barrow 1970 (1?)2-caps 1-try 3-points
 Joseph "Joe" Jones won caps for Wales while at Wigan and Barrow 1940…1949 15-caps, and won a cap for Great Britain while at Barrow in 1946 against New Zealand
 Bryn Knowelden won caps for England while at Barrow 1944 Wales, 1945 Wales, 1947 France won caps for Great Britain while at Barrow 1946 New Zealand
 James "Jimmy" Lewthwaite won caps for England while at Barrow 1952 Other Nationalities
 William "Billy" Little won caps for England while at Barrow 1933 Other Nationalities, 1934 Australia, France
 Mark McJennett won caps for Wales while at Barrow 1980…1984 2-caps + 1-cap (sub), Australia, France and England

 Reg Parker won caps for England while at Barrow 1955 Other Nationalities
 Gordon Pritchard won caps for Wales while at Barrow, and Cardiff City (Bridgend) Blue Dragons 1978…1981 1(3?)-caps + 2-caps (sub)
 Barry Pugh won caps for Wales while at Barrow Raiders 2004(…2005?) 2-caps
 Edmund "Eddie" Szymala won caps for England while at Barrow 1979 France (sub) won caps for Great Britain while at Barrow 1981 France (sub), France
 Edward "Ted" Toohey won caps for England while at Barrow 1952 Other Nationalities (2 matches) won caps for Great Britain while at Barrow 1952 Australia (3 matches)
 Alec Troup won caps for England while at Barrow 1934 Australia, France, 1935 Wales, 1936 Wales won caps for Great Britain while at Barrow 1936 New Zealand (2 matches)
 John "Jack" T. 'Tank' Woods won caps for England while at Barrow 1930 Other Nationalities, 1930 Wales, 1933 Other Nationalities won caps for Great Britain while at Barrow 1933 Australia

Other notable players
These players have either; won or played in the final of Challenge Cup, Rugby Football League Championship, Lancashire County Cup, Lancashire League, have received a Testimonial match, were international representatives before, or after, their time at Barrow, or are notable outside of rugby league.

 Fred 'Legs' Atkins 1959  Corporation Combine ARLFC, Barrow Island ARLFC (loan to Blackpool Borough) born circa-1937, died (aged 75) in Blackpool’s Victoria Hospital Thursday 28 June 2012, 1-appearance away against Warrington in December 1959, pigeon fancier
 Harry Atkinson 1951 Challenge Cup
 Phil Atkinson 125-tries
 Brian Backhouse circa-1967
  Harry Bath
 Les Belshaw 1955 Challenge Cup Left-
 Clive Best 1955 Challenge Cup 
 Cliff Beverley
 Matthew Blake
 Walter "Wally" Bowyer 1951 Challenge Cup (reserve), 1955 Challenge Cup assistant coach
 Andy Bracek
 Gary Broadbent
 Andrew Brocklehurst
 Thomas "Tom" Brophy 1966-1972
 Liam Campbell
 Keale Carlile
 Mick Cassidy
 Ned Catic
  Robert "Rob" Cummins
 James "Jim" Challinor circa-1967
 David Chisnall
 Paul Crarey
 Henry Delooze circa-1967
 George Dobson (Testimonial match 1922)
 Joseph "Joe" Doyle
 Robert "Bob" Eccles circa-1993
 Andrew Ellis
 Malcolm Flynn (Testimonial match 1986)
 Frank Foster
 James Fox 100-tries
 Freddie French  circa-1938
 Ade Gardner
 Ken Gill
 Derek Hadley (Testimonial match 1983)
 Roy Haggerty
 John 'Dinks' Harris
 Liam Harrison
 Ralph Hartley 1951 Challenge Cup
  Kevin Hastings
 Bill Healey 1955 Challenge Cup 
 Andrew Henderson
 Cavill Heugh
 John Higgin 1933≥1947 1946/7 Testimonial matches
 Frank Hill circa-1954, 1955 Challenge Cup trainer
 John Holmes
 Darren Holt (Testimonial match 2009)
 Raymond "Ray" Hopwood circa-1967
 Adam Hughes
 Harry Hughes circa-1967
 Robert Irving
 Matt James
 Michael "Mick" James (Testimonial match 1990)
 Ivor Kelland circa-1967
 David "Dave" Kendall (#10) circa-1987
 James King
 Michael Knowles
 Simon Knox
 Sevania Koroi
 Danny Leatherbarrow circa-1954
 Hugh Lloyd-Davies
 Ian Lloyd
 Frank Longman  (#8) circa-1948 → 1951 Challenge Cup
 Zebastian Lucky Luisi
 Matthew McConnell
 Ralph McConnell circa-1981 107-tries
 Hughie McGregor 1951 Challenge Cup
 Dan McKeating from Whitehaven (Recreation?)  1932≥1947 1946/7 Testimonial matches
 Joseph "Joe" McKeever
 Jack McKinnell 1951 Challenge Cup
 Martin McLoughlin
 R. McLester circa-1922
 John Mantle
 Iain Marsh
 Steve Mossop (Testimonial match 1990)
 Michael "Mike" Murray circa-1967
 James Nixon
 Ron O'Regan
 James Peters
 Steve Rae (#6) circa-1987
 Rod Reddy
 Maurice Redhead circa-1967
 Damien Reid
 John Risman
 Jason Roach
 Jamie Rooney
 Steve Rowan circa-1992
 Paul Salmon
 Michael "Mike" Sanderson circa-1967
 Walter Scott 175-tries
 Thomas "Tommy" Smales
 Gerald "Ged" Smith circa-1967
 Harry Stretch 1951 Challenge Cup
 Waisale Sukanaveita
 Alipate Tani
 Edward "Eddie" Tees circa-1967
 Jim Thornburrow circa-1938
 Steve Tickle (Testimonial match 1988)
 Cec Thompson (#11/#12)
 Frederick "Fred" Tomlinson circa-1967
 Hugh Waddell
 Michael "Mike" Watson circa-1967
 Bob Wear  circa-1967
 Pat Weisner
 Alan Whittle

References

Barrow Raiders